Eremias kokshaaliensis  is a species of lizard found in China and Kyrgyzstan.

References

Eremias
Reptiles described in 1999
Reptiles of China
Reptiles of Central Asia
Taxa named by Valery Konstantinovich Jeremčenko
Taxa named by Alexander M. Panfilov